Rhyssomatus is a genus of true weevils in the beetle family Curculionidae. There are at least 180 described species in Rhyssomatus.

See also
 List of Rhyssomatus species

References

Further reading

External links

 

Molytinae
Articles created by Qbugbot